Scripps Coastal Reserve is a 126-acre (51 hectare) University of California Natural Reserve System reserve located west of UC San Diego in the La Jolla Farms area of La Jolla, California. Administered by UC San Diego, the site is owned by the University of California and managed for teaching and research.

The reserve includes an 80-acre underwater and shoreline reserve and a 46-acre aboveground knoll. The underwater reserve comprises coastal areas that are now part of the San Diego-Scripps State Marine Conservation Area. The knoll includes a publicly accessible mesa, trails through Black's Canyon, and the privately owned but university-administered Sumner Canyon.

History
The underwater component of Scripps Coastal Reserve was purchased from the State in 1929. In 1967, the University of California purchased the William Black House and the adjacent knoll from William H. Black.

Ecology

Birds
Flora
Herptiles
Mammals

Use
The marsh is used by Scripps Institution of Oceanography students and scientists to study coastal flora, fauna and microbes, as well as determine appropriate and novel strategies for environmental preservation and conservation. Its proximity to Black's Beach also makes it a moderately frequented route for tourists and surfers.

References

External links
 UC San Diego Natural Reserve System: Scripps Coastal Reserve
 UC Natural Reserve System: Scripps Coastal Reserve

Protected areas of San Diego County, California
University of California Natural Reserve System
Geography of San Diego
University of California, San Diego